Al-Aryam Island is an island in the Persian gulf off the west coast of Abu Dhabi in the United Arab Emirates. It was formerly known as Bu Khushaishah. The island is 60km away from Abu Dhabi and is connected to the mainland through a bridge.

References 

Archaeological sites in the United Arab Emirates
Islands of the Emirate of Abu Dhabi
Central Region, Abu Dhabi